Catherine Borghi (born 23 September 1976 in Les Diablerets) is a Swiss former alpine skier who competed in the 1998 Winter Olympics and 2002 Winter Olympics.

External links
 

1976 births
Living people
Swiss female alpine skiers
Olympic alpine skiers of Switzerland
Alpine skiers at the 1998 Winter Olympics
Alpine skiers at the 2002 Winter Olympics
Sportspeople from the canton of Vaud
20th-century Swiss women
21st-century Swiss women